Franz is a 1971 Belgian-French film directed by Jacques Brel.

Plot 
The story takes place in a Belgian seaside town, at a boarding house for convalescing civil servants. The six male residents' lives change dramatically when two women arrive. Catherine is a lively, sexually liberated woman willing to kiss, dance, and sleep with the men. Leonie is reserved, formal, and conservative. Leonie finds herself attracted to Leon, a Belgian who was a mercenary in Katanga in 1964, He was wounded and carries psychological scars of war. The other men play practical jokes on Leon, some of them cruel. As Leon courts Leonie, his mother brings him emotional distress as do his memories of war. The unlikely pair struggle to get past these obstacles.

Cast 

 Jacques Brel – Leon
 Barbara – Leonie
 Danièle Évenou – Catherine 
 Fernand Fabre – Antoine
 Louis Navarre – Armond
 Ceel – Pascal
 Serge Sauvion – Serge
 François Cadet – Jules
 Luc Poret – Henri
 Jacques Provins – Grosjean
 Catherine Bady – Madame Grosjean

References

External links 

1971 films
Belgian romantic drama films
French romantic drama films
1970s French-language films
Films directed by Jacques Brel
1970s French films